Renavas (Samogitian: Rėnavs) is a village in Mažeikiai District Municipality, Lithuania. It is located on the left bank of Varduva river, nearby the road Židikai-Seda. The village is known for its 16th century manor.

History

The manor was first mentioned in the 16th century. The current manor was built around 1880. In 1933 St. Isidore Church was built.

The village operates a high school, library and hydroelectric plant. The manor is now an affiliate of Mažeikiai museum.

References
 

Villages in Telšiai County
Mažeikiai District Municipality
Duchy of Samogitia
Telshevsky Uyezd